The 2022 FIBA U18 European Championship was the 37th edition of the European basketball championship for national under-18 teams. It was played from 30 July to 7 August 2022 in İzmir, Turkey. Spain men's national under-18 basketball team won the tournament and became the European champions for the fifth time.

Participating teams

  (Third place, 2019 FIBA U18 European Championship Division B)

  (Winners, 2019 FIBA U18 European Championship Division B)

  (Runners-up, 2019 FIBA U18 European Championship Division B)

First round
The draw of the first round was held on 15 February 2022 in Freising, Germany.

In the first round, the teams were drawn into four groups of four. All teams advance to the playoffs.

Group A

Group B

Group C

Group D

Playoffs

Main bracket

Round of 16

Quarterfinals

Semifinals

Third place game

Final

5th place bracket

9th place bracket

13th place bracket

Final standings

See also
 2022 FIBA U18 European Championship Division B

References

External links 

2022
2022–23 in European basketball
International youth basketball competitions hosted by Turkey
FIBA U18
July 2022 sports events in Turkey
August 2022 sports events in Turkey
Sports competitions in Izmir
2020s in İzmir